Kono language may refer to the following languages of West Africa:

 Kono language (Sierra Leone) (kno), spoken by the Kono people
 Kono language (Guinea) (knu), a variety of the Kpelle language
 Kono language (Nigeria) (klk), a Kainji language